Honorata Górna (born 7 April 1968 in Świecie) is a Polish former ice dancer. With former partner Andrzej Dostatni, she is a three-time Polish national champion and competed at the 1988 Winter Olympics.

Results 
(with Dostatni)

References

External links 
 Honorata Górna at Sports Reference

Polish female ice dancers
Living people
1968 births
People from Świecie
Olympic figure skaters of Poland
Figure skaters at the 1988 Winter Olympics
Sportspeople from Kuyavian-Pomeranian Voivodeship